Libongue is a town and commune of Angola, located in the province of Huíla.

Geography

Climate 
The climate of Libongue is BSh, a hot semi-arid climate.

See also 

 Communes of Angola

References 

Populated places in Huíla Province